Kirkuk District is a district in Kirkuk Governorate, Iraq. Its administrative center is the city of Kirkuk.

References

Districts of Kirkuk Province